Eetu Rissanen (born 15 October 2002) is a Finnish footballer who plays as a forward.

Career statistics

Club

Notes

References

2002 births
Living people
Finnish footballers
Finland youth international footballers
Association football forwards
Pallo-Kerho 37 players
Kuopion Palloseura players
SC Kuopio Futis-98 players
Vaasan Palloseura players
Kokkolan Palloveikot players
Veikkausliiga players
Kakkonen players
Ykkönen players